George Verschoor (born 1960) is a showrunner, director and a creator of television shows, known primarily for producing unscripted and reality series for television, such as The Real World, on which he retains a creative consultant credit.  He is considered one of the pioneers of non-fiction programming.

Career 
Verschoor developed, produced and directed the first four seasons of MTV's groundbreaking series The Real World, which launched the modern non-fiction genre and is one of the longest-running reality programs in history.  As an Emmy-nominated showrunner, he executive produced and directed MTV's Fear, created and ran the hybrid mystery series Murder in Small Town X for FOX, and was creator and showrunner for the live music competition series Nashville Star, which went for six season and launched the career of country music star Miranda Lambert.

Verschoor also executive produced and was showrunner of the long-running ABC hit series Extreme Makeover: Home Edition. He also executive produced the David Lynch Foundation's star-studded charity benefit Change Begins Within for PBS, featuring a reunion of the two surviving Beatles, Sir Paul McCartney and Ringo Starr.

Verschoor executive produced and directed other successful television series, including the scripted comedies Austin Stories, Howard Stern's Son of the Beach, and Blowin' Up starring Jamie Kennedy. He also executive produced the award-winning National Geographic documentary film Death on the Mountain: the Women of K2.

As part of an overall development and production deal with National Geographic Channel, Verschoor executive produced the hit investigative series Border Wars, and created and executive produced the documentary adventure series Die Trying, and their off-the-grid build series Building Wild.

Most recently, Verschoor has been helming the building competition series Home Free (2015 TV series) starring noted contractor and TV host Mike Holmes. The series premiered on the Fox network on July 22, 2015 and he is noted for coming up with Holmes' patented catchphrase "This is gonna be good!" 

Verschoor is the founder and President of Hoosick Falls Productions, based in Santa Monica, CA.  He currently serves on the advisory board of the S.I. Newhouse School of Public Communications at Syracuse University, the board of directors for the Woodstock Academy of Music, and is an executive producer with David Lynch Foundation Television.

Productions

References

External links
Hoosick Falls Productions on Facebook

Living people
1960 births
American people of Dutch descent
American television producers
People from New York (state)